Paddle game may refer to:

 Paddle (game controller), a type of joystick
 Paddle ball, a one-person game played with a paddle and an attached ball
 Paddle-ball, a sport played on a court half the size of a tennis court
 Paddle tennis, a game adapted from tennis
 Table tennis racket, a laminated wood paddle used for table tennis